AGWA or Agwa may refer to:

Agwa de Bolivia, a herbal liqueur made with Bolivian coca leaves and 37 other natural herbs and botanicals
Art Gallery of Western Australia, Perth, Australia
Australian Government Web Archive, consisting of the bulk archiving of Commonwealth Government websites